Virginia Serret (1914-1958) was a Mexican film actress. She appeared in around thirty films during the Golden age of Mexican cinema. Serret was married to the Argentine actor Luis Aldás.

Selected filmography
 Heads or Tails (1937)
 Poor Devil (1940)
 Con Su Amable Permiso (1940)
 Woman Without a Soul (1944)
 Porfirio Díaz (1944)
 The Hour of Truth (1945)
 Song of the Siren (1948)

References

Bibliography
 Wood, Andrew Grant. Agustin Lara: A Cultural Biography. Oxford University Press, 2014.

External links

1914 births
1958 deaths
Mexican film actresses
Actresses from Veracruz
20th-century Mexican actresses